Jaroslav Nesvadba (born 5 May 1982) is a Czech footballer who plays for FK Spartak MAS Sezimovo Ústí.

Nesvadba previously played in the Czech Gambrinus liga with FK Jablonec 97 and FK Mladá Boleslav. He had a brief spells in the Russian Premier League with FC Zenit Saint Petersburg, where he played for their reserves, and the Croatian First League with NK Inter Zaprešić.

References

1982 births
Living people
Czech footballers
Association football defenders
FK Jablonec players
FC Zenit Saint Petersburg players
FK Mladá Boleslav players
NK Inter Zaprešić players
FC Silon Táborsko players
Czech First League players
Russian Premier League players
Croatian Football League players
Expatriate footballers in Russia
Expatriate footballers in Croatia